Osvaldo Güenzatti (born 23 March 1931) was an Argentine footballer. He played in two matches for the Argentina national football team in 1959. He was also part of Argentina's squad for the 1959 South American Championship that took place in Argentina.

References

External links
 

1931 births
Possibly living people
Argentine footballers
Argentina international footballers
Place of birth missing (living people)
Association football midfielders
Chacarita Juniors footballers
Club Atlético Atlanta footballers
Club Atlético Vélez Sarsfield footballers
Sportivo Dock Sud players
Club Almirante Brown footballers
Footballers from Buenos Aires